Michael Okantey (born 30 October 1939) is a Ghanaian former sprinter who competed in the 1960 Summer Olympics and in the 1964 Summer Olympics.

References

1939 births
Living people
Ghanaian male sprinters
Olympic athletes of Ghana
Athletes (track and field) at the 1960 Summer Olympics
Athletes (track and field) at the 1964 Summer Olympics
Commonwealth Games silver medallists for Ghana
Commonwealth Games medallists in athletics
Athletes (track and field) at the 1962 British Empire and Commonwealth Games
Sportspeople from Accra
Medallists at the 1962 British Empire and Commonwealth Games